Fireworks are a class of low explosive pyrotechnic devices used for aesthetic and entertainment purposes.

Firework(s) may also refer to:

Film and television
 Fireworks (1947 film), a film by Kenneth Anger
 Fireworks (1954 film), a German film
 Fireworks (1997 film), an Italian film
 Hana-bi, a 1997 Japanese film released in the United States as Fireworks
 Fireworks, Should We See It from the Side or the Bottom? (1993 film) or Fireworks, a Japanese film by Shunji Iwai
 Fireworks (2017 film), a Japanese anime film based on the 1993 film
 Fireworks (2000 TV series), a South Korean TV series broadcast on SBS
 Fireworks (2006 TV series), a South Korean TV series broadcast on MBC
 "Fireworks" (30 Rock), a 2007 episode of 30 Rock

Music

Classical music
Music for the Royal Fireworks, a suite by George Frideric Handel
 Feu d'artifice, Op. 4 (Fireworks), a 1908 composition by Igor Stravinsky

Groups
Fireworks (band), an indie rock band from New York City
Fireworks (punk band), a punk band from Michigan

Albums and EPs
 Fireworks (Angra album) (1998)
 Fireworks (Bonfire album)
 Fireworks EP, an EP by Embrace
 Fireworks: The Singles 1997–2002, a compilation album by Embrace
 Fireworks (Pele album) (1992)
 Fireworks (This Busy Monster album) (2001)

Songs
"Fireworks" (Animal Collective song) (2007)
"Fireworks" (Drake song) (2010)
"4th of July (Fireworks)", a song by Kelis
"Fireworks" (Roxette song) (1994)
"Fireworks" (Siouxsie and the Banshees song) (1982)
"Fireworks" (Snoop Dogg song) (2016)
"Fireworks" (The Tragically Hip song)
"Fireworks", a 2016 song by Mitski from Puberty 2
"Fireworks", a 2007 track from Nicholas Hooper's score from Harry Potter and the Order of the Phoenix
"Fireworks", a 2010 song by R. Kelly from Epic
"Fireworks", a 2016 song by Sunwoo Jung-a and Jung Yong-hwa from Empathy
"Fireworks", a 1920s jazz song by Spencer Williams
"Fireworks", a Schoolhouse Rock! song
"Fireworks", a 2021 song by Purple Disco Machine
"Firework" (song), a song by Katy Perry
"Firework", a 2016 song by the Boxer Rebellion from Ocean by Ocean 
"Firework", a 2017 song by Got7 from 7 for 7 
"Firework", a 2020 song by Twice from More & More
"Firework", a song from the video game Rocket League

Other uses
Fireworks (magazine), a magazine for fireworks enthusiasts
 Fireworks (play), a 1969 set of three one-act plays by Jon Swan
Fireworks: Nine Profane Pieces, a short story collection by Angela Carter
 Fireworks Entertainment, a Canadian film and television company
Adobe Fireworks, drawing software